"I'm the One" is a song by Liverpudlian band Gerry and the Pacemakers, released as a single in January 1964. It was a top-ten hit in the UK and also charted in the US.

Release
In 1963, Gerry and the Pacemakers became the first group to top the UK charts with their first three singles. For their fourth single, they decided to release a song penned by lead singer Gerry Marsden. However, it didn't manage to continue their chart-topping streak, as on all the major UK charts, it was held off the top by another Liverpudlian group, the Searchers with "Needles and Pins". Whilst Gerry and the Pacemakers would only go on to achieve another two top-ten hits in the UK ("Don't Let the Sun Catch You Crying" and "Ferry Cross the Mersey"), they did enjoy some success in North America as part of the British Invasion; although, in the US "I'm the One" did not perform particularly well, failing to make the Cash Box Top 100 and only peaking at number 82 on the Billboard Hot 100.

"I'm the One" wasn't released on an album in the UK, but was included on Don't Let the Sun Catch You Crying in the US. In March 1964, an EP entitled I'm the One was released in the UK featuring the title track, the single's B-side "You've Got What I Like", and two tracks from the album How Do You Like It?, "You Can't Fool Me" and "Don't You Ever". The EP peaked at number 11 on the Record Retailer EP chart.

Charts

References

1964 singles
Gerry and the Pacemakers songs
Songs written by Gerry Marsden
Song recordings produced by George Martin
Columbia Graphophone Company singles
Laurie Records singles
1964 songs